The F Constituição (F42) is a Niterói-class frigate of the Brazilian Navy. The Constituição was the fourth Niterói-class frigate ordered by the Brazilian Navy, on 20 September 1970. The Constituição was launched on 15 April 1976, and was commissioned on 31 March 1978.

History
In June 2009, the F Constituição (F42) participated in the recovery mission for the wreckage of Air France Flight 447.

On 20 February 2010, the Constituição brought twelve students, faculty, and crew of the SV Concordia ashore after they were initially rescued by merchant vessels. The remaining 52 students, faculty, and crew were to be transferred from merchant vessels to the Constituição and another Brazilian frigate, but weather and other concerns prevented that.

Gallery

References

Niteroi-class frigates
1976 ships
Ships built in Southampton
Frigates of the Cold War